

Results

Qualification rounds
('Q': Automatic Qualifier, 'q': Fastest Loser Qualifier, '-': Did not start, 'DNS',  Did not qualify, 'DQ' - Disqualified, 'n/a' Not applicable
SB: Season's Best, PB: Personal Best)

Men

200m M

Women

100m W

200m W

Heptathlon

Competitors

Men
200m: Seth Amoo

Women 
100 m: Vida Anim
200 m: Vida Anim
Heptathlon: Margaret Simpson

References

Sources
IAAF:Results by events

Nations at the 2007 World Championships in Athletics
World Championships in Athletics
2007